Punta Allen, (officially Javier Rojo Gómez) is the largest village in the Sian Ka'an Biosphere Reserve at the end of the Boca Paila Peninsula in Tulum Municipality in the Mexican state of Quintana Roo. It is a small Mayan fishing village with a 2010 census population of 469 inhabitants, and the only land access is by a rough 50 kilometre track.

The village has only about 4-5 blocks of sandy streets going inland from the sea and is only about 6-7 streets wide. Punta Allen has 1 generator that runs electricity to the village during two periods daily; 11am - 2pm and from 7pm - midnight.

For nutrition, the village has four mini markets, a fresh seafood store/house, a produce store/house, a lobster co-op that makes ice, and a number of restaurants along the beachfront and scattered around town. 

The beach is not groomed, and is littered with garbage brought in by the waves. Most of this garbage comes from cruise ships and coastal settlements with open landfills. Every time a hurricane passes it picks up the garbage and deposits it in the sea, to be left until it makes its way to one of the beaches.

The main pier of the village is manned by armed law enforcement personnel to discourage Caribbean drug smugglers from using Punta Allen's remote location as an ingress point.

Notes

External links

Populated places in Quintana Roo
Populated coastal places in Mexico
Tulum (municipality)
Beaches of Quintana Roo
Fishing communities